Don Dudley (born 1930, Los Angeles) is an American artist who has worked on both the West Coast and East Coast of the United States. His early work is associated with the Finish Fetish school in California of the late 1960s as well as with New York Minimalism of the 1970s. Dudley studied painting at the Chouinard Institute with Abstract Expressionist painter Richards Ruben.

Dudley relocated from Los Angeles to New York City in the early 1970s where he exhibited widely at venues such as the New Museum, the Queens Museum, the Whitney Museum of American Art as well as the List Visual Arts Center at M.I.T.

Career 
Ken Johnson of The New York Times writes, “Mr. Dudley, 80, was an active player in the turn to hedonistic simplicity in painting in the late 1960s and early ’70s, first as a Finish Fetishist on the West Coast and then, after moving to New York in the early ’70s, in the Mondrian to Brice Marden mode. Mr. Dudley was in the Whitney Museum of American Art’s 1972 Annual (a precursor to the Whitney Biennial), devoted to contemporary American painting.” Writing for East of Borneo (magazine), the critic Saul Ostrow provides another description of Dudley's work, which is notable in its use of metallic and fluorescent paints developed for use in home decoration: "Dudley’s works appear at first to be monochromes, but they really aren’t. The colors range from a decoratively appealing palette of whites, to saturated yellows and violet and blue metallic (metal flack-looking) pigments. Liminal shifts of color and tone produce noticeably different spatial and perceptual effects." Writing for Art in America, Sarah Schmerler compares Dudley's work to his peers such as Richard Artschwager, Jennifer Bartlett and Anthony Caro. Recent exhibitions include exhibitions at Galerie Thomas Zander in Cologne, Mendes Wood in São Paulo, Magenta Plains in New York City as well as Between Two Worlds: Art of California at the San Francisco Museum of Modern Art in San Francisco.

Collections 
 San Francisco Museum of Modern Art
 Whitney Museum of American Art, New York, NY
 Albright–Knox Art Gallery, Buffalo, NY
 Oceanside Art Museum, Oceanside, CA
 Chase Manhattan Bank, New York City

Personal life 
Don Dudley lives and works in New York City and Kerhonkson, NY and is married to artist Shirley Irons.

References 

1930 births
Living people
21st-century American painters
California Institute of the Arts alumni
Minimalism
Minimalist artists
People from Los Angeles